The 2018–2019 Bikarkeppni kvenna, named Geysisbikarinn for sponsorship reasons, was the 45th edition of the Icelandic Women's Basketball Cup, won by Valur against Stjarnan. The competition is managed by the Icelandic Basketball Federation and the final four was held in the Laugardalshöll in Reykjavík during the days of 13–16 February 2019. Helena Sverrisdóttir was named the Cup Finals MVP after turning in 31 points, 13 rebounds and 6 assists.

Danielle Rodriguez of Stjarnan led all scorers with 104 points in 4 games.

Participating teams
Sixteen teams signed up for the Cup tournament.

Bracket

Cup Finals MVP

References

External links
2018–2019 Tournament results

Women's Cup